Robert Sager is an American philanthropist and photographer, best known for founding the Sager Family Traveling Foundation and Roadshow, a charitable organization. Sager also was a partner and the president of Gordon Brothers Group from 1985 to 2000.

Early life 
Sager was raised in Malden, Massachusetts, a suburb of Boston. His father owned a small jewelry business, while his mother was a homemaker who sometimes worked as a small-time activist for local African-American couples having issues renting apartments. Mrs. Sager would rent the apartments on behalf of the couples and later take the landlords to court.

Despite aspiring to become an actor, Sager pursued business, graduating from Brandeis University in 1976 with a degree in economics, then going on to obtain a Masters of Management from Yale University.

In 1985, Sager joined Gordon Brothers Group as a partner and served as their president. Between 1985 and his departure from Gordon Brothers in 2000, Sager helped the company grow from a $10 million a year business to a multi-billion dollar business with 20 offices in North America, Europe, and Asia. Sager still serves on the board of advisors for Gordon Brothers.

Sager is also a member of the Young Presidents' Organization. In 2013, Sager was awarded the YPO Hickok Award, its highest honor for a member. In 2002, he was awarded the YPO Global Humanitarian Award.

Philanthropy

In 1999, Sager met the musician and activist Sting at a bar in Brazil. Sager was looking for a tour of the interior of the rainforest and asked Sting for contacts. The two kept in touch after that point. In the words of Sting, Sager's frequent travelmate, he is "a big brash guy from Boston...an old Nepal hand, flamboyant eccentric, inexhaustible world traveler, and practical philanthropist."

In 2000, Sager resigned his position at Gordon Brothers and founded the Sager Family Traveling Foundation and Roadshow, a charitable organization. He, along with his wife Elaine, daughter Tess, and son Shane, packed up their things and ventured out into some of the most dangerous places on the planet to make a difference. Through the foundation, Sager and his family live in villages and cities in developing countries using hands-on perspective and eyeball-to-eyeball connection to conceive, develop and operate economic opportunity training and leadership programs. These programs include teacher training, leadership training, micro-enterprise, and peace and reconciliation efforts. On any given day you might find Sager living in a tent in Karachi, sharing a toilet with 40 monks in the Himalayas, working alongside President Kagame in Rwanda, or discussing science education with the Dalai Lama in India. He would later tell The Chronicle of Philanthropy, "It wasn't like I had this moment of awareness or I said, I've been fortunate and now I want to give back. It was about me in my quest for fullness in my life, looking at my situation and saying, more money isn't going to give me more return on investment because I already have all that I want that money can buy."

Sager convenes groups of international entrepreneurs from different parts of the world through the Young Presidents’ Organization (YPO) so that they can use their networks to collaborate and gain insights that help them connect the dots. He is a founding chairman of the Young Presidents’ Organization (YPO) Peace Action Network, which convenes business leaders from different sides of conflicts.  Together they strategize and implement innovative approaches to cross-border understanding and shared opportunity. Sager is also the founder of YPO's Presidents’ Action Net (PAN), a philanthropic search engine that connects presidents from over 100 countries in order to leverage their efforts around the world.  PAN draws from a community of approximately 20,000 presidents whose businesses have aggregate sales that are the equivalent of the world's third largest GNP. Sager is a moderator of both the Indo-Pak Action Forum and the U.S. Arab Action Forum.

In addition to his philanthropic and business endeavors Sager was an Executive Producer for “A Guide to Recognizing Your Saints,” (2006) winner of the Sundance Film Festival Special Jury Prize, inspiration for the NBC primetime show “The Philanthropist” (2009), and author of “The Power of the Invisible Sun,” released by Chronicle Books (2009), which was featured on NBC's the TODAY show and ABC World News’ “Person of the Week.” Throughout his travels Sager has been an active photographer and has had his work featured in Rolling Stone, Men's Journal, and philanthropic publications.  From 2007–2008, 49 of Sager's photos were featured on the reunion tour of The Police during the song, “Invisible Sun.”  The photos were displayed at over 100 concerts in 40 countries to a collective audience of over 4 million people.  The Power of the Invisible Sun is a collection of his photographs of children in the most desperate and worn-town places in the world and a call to action and activism. It was produced by Sager and Sting and published in August 2009. Chronicle wrote about Sager's book: “In war-torn countries around the world, philanthropist and photographer Bobby Sager has discovered the transcendent power of hope through the eyes of children. Despite unthinkable violence and destruction, his portraits reveal joy, innocence, and strength.” Sager has also been an active public speaker, speaking at such venues as the United Nations General Assembly Hall, Sydney Opera House, Grand Mosque in Oman, and Aiwan-e-Sadr, residence of the President of Pakistan. He was also the executive producer of “Saints” (2006), winner at the Sundance and Venice Film Festivals.

The Philanthropist Television Show

The Minot's Ledge Light
In 2009 the federal government put up the Minot's Ledge Light as surplus, and it was purchased and is currently maintained by Sager.

References

Brandeis University alumni
American philanthropists
People from Malden, Massachusetts
Year of birth missing (living people)
Living people
Yale School of Management alumni
20th-century American photographers
21st-century American photographers